Chaetodon nigropunctatus, the black-spotted butterflyfish, is a species off marine ray-finned fish, a butterflyfish, belonging to the family Chaetodontidae. It is found in the north western Indian Ocean.

Description
Chaetodon nigropunctatus has a whitish mouth set in a grey face, the colour of the body is greyish white and it is marked with many longitudinal rows of dark grey spots. The tail is black with a white margin. The dorsal fin has 13 spines and 21-23 soft rays while the anal fin has 3 spines and 18-20 soft rays.

Distribution
Chaetodon nigropunctatus is found in the northwestern Indian Ocean. It occurs in the Persian Gulf, Gulf of Oman and the Arabian Sea coast of the Arabian Peninsula.

Habitat and biology
They are thought to feed mainly on coral polyps. it occurs over reefs, either of coral or rock, and sometime in Sandy lagoon areas.

Systematics
Chaetodon nigropunctatus was first formally described in 1880 by the French paleontologist, ichthyologist, and herpetologist Henri Émile Sauvage (1842-1917) with the type locality was given as Oman. It belongs to the large subgenus Rabdophorus which might warrant recognition as a distinct genus.

Utilsation
Chaetodon nigropunctatus is rare in the aquarium trade. However, it is a difficult species to keep in captivity due to its specialised diet of live coral polyps.

References

nigropunctatus
Fish described in 1880
Taxa named by Henri Émile Sauvage